Luigi Rossi (1853–1923) was a Swiss painter.

Biography
Luigi Rossi was born in Cassarate, Lugano.  Having studied at the Brera Academy of Fine Arts under the guidance of Giuseppe Bertini, Rossi made his artistic debut in 1871, inaugurating a repertoire of genre scenes with a subtle vein of social criticism that was to be a distinctive feature of his work. His Swiss origin prevented him from receiving the prestigious Prince Umberto Prize, reserved for citizens of the Kingdom of Italy, in 1878. His repertoire then broadened during the 1880s to include mountain landscapes painted en plein air, scenes of peasant life and portraits. The period from 1885 to 1888 was spent in Paris, where he also worked a great deal as an illustrator for Alphonse Daudet and Pierre Loti in particular. Having returned to Milan, he came into contact with the poet Gian Pietro Lucini, a meeting that marks a turning point also in his work as a painter. This led to some of his most celebrated canvases, which are still solidly realistic but informed by the new Symbolist approach. A regular participant in the major Italian and international events with paintings and watercolours, he held a solo show at the Galleria Pesaro, Milan, in 1921. He died in Biolda, Lugano.  His death was commemorated with two posthumous shows, one at the Società per le Belle Arti ed Esposizione Permanente in Milan and the other at Villa Ciani, Lugano, in 1924.

References
 Elena Lissoni, Luigi Rossi, online catalogue Artgate by Fondazione Cariplo, 2010, CC BY-SA (source for the first revision of this article).
Jean Soldini, Tra prudenza e inquietudine. L'opera di Luigi Rossi (1853-1923), Bellinzona, Casagrande, 1985.

Other projects

1853 births
1923 deaths
19th-century Swiss painters
19th-century Italian male artists
Swiss male painters
20th-century Swiss painters
20th-century Italian male artists
19th-century Italian painters
Italian male painters
20th-century Italian painters
19th-century Swiss male artists
20th-century Swiss male artists